Jennifer Foster is an English scholar of prehistoric and medieval archaeology, who specializes in the study of artifacts, particularly metalwork.

Career 
Foster is a scholar of prehistoric and medieval archaeology, who specializes in the study of artifacts. She formerly worked at the British Museum, and at the University of Oxford's Ashmolean Museum. She teaches at the University of Reading. For the last 30 years she has taught archaeology to continuing education students at the university, with classes such as "The Ethics of Archaeology" and "The Legend and Archaeology of King Arthur." She has given talks on subjects such as experimental archaeology, and Sutton Hoo.

Personal life 
Foster is married to Martin Bell, a professor of archaeological science at the University of Reading.

Publications 
In addition to a number of articles and chapters, Foster has written four monographs, including one on Iron Age and Roman boar figurines, one on the Lexden tumulus, and one an introduction to European archaeology before the Roman conquest, based on the collection in the British Ashmolean Museum.

Foster's first book, Bronze Boar Figurines in Iron Age and Roman Britain, described and illustrated 22 examples of bronze boars from the Iron Age and Roman Britain, and described the animal's millennia-long role in European cultures; a related article that came out the same year, "A Boar Figurine from Guilden Morden, Cambs.", detailed the Guilden Morden boar, a sixth- or seventh-century Anglo-Saxon copper alloy figure of a boar that may have once served as the crest of a helmet. In a 1995 article she argued that Iron Age smiths creating high quality metalwork in Britain might have travelled around stopping at different sites, rather than having a fixed abode, and would produce multiple pieces at each site, as at Gussage All Saints, Dorset.

Books

Chapters

Articles 
  
 Images on plate XIV
  
  
 
 
 
 Includes "Copper alloy objects (excluding brooches)" (pp. 143–147), "Iron and copper alloy needles" (p. 186), "Copper alloy bracelets" (p. 192), "Copper alloy pins" (pp. 192–194), "Copper alloy rings" (p. 194), "Composite rings" (pp. 194–196), "Copper alloy buttons and dress fasteners" (p. 196), "Copper alloy sheet" (pp. 196–197), "Possible mirror" (p. 197), "Metal containers and container fittings: copper alloy" (pp. 227–228), "Harness equipment" (pp. 233–235), "Violence" (pp. 235–242), "Stone, clay, and copper alloy weighing equipment" (pp. 247–248), "Coral" (p. 262)

Reviews

References

Bibliography

External links 
Foster's bibliography at Archaeology Data Service

Living people
Academics of the University of Reading
English archaeologists
British women archaeologists
British archaeologists
Year of birth missing (living people)